The  is the 25th edition of the Japan Academy Film Prize, an award presented by the Nippon Academy-Sho Association to award excellence in filmmaking. It awarded the best films of 2001 and it took place on March 8, 2002 at the Grand Prince Hotel New Takanawa in Tokyo, Japan.

Nominees

Awards

References

External links 
  - 
 Complete list of awards and nominations for the 25th Japan Academy Prize - 

Japan Academy Film Prize
2002 in Japanese cinema
Japan Academy Film Prize
March 2002 events in Japan